Union Furnace is an unincorporated community in northern Starr Township, Hocking County, Ohio, United States.  It has a post office with the ZIP code 43158.  It is located along State Route 328, which forms the main street in Union Furnace.

History
Union Furnace originally referred to a blast furnace built on site in the 1850s. A post office has been in operation at Union Furnace since 1873.

References

Unincorporated communities in Ohio
Unincorporated communities in Hocking County, Ohio